Rana  or  Rane  is a Title of Maharaja

Notable people bearing the name
Rane include:

 Datta Rane, politician
 Harshvardhan Rane, actor
 Jayesh Rane, footballer
 Kartika Rane, actress
 Narayan Rane, politician
 Nitesh Narayan Rane, politician
 Nilesh Narayan Rane, politician
 Pratapsingh Rane, politician
 Rama Raghoba Rane, soldier
 Ranjita Rane, cricketer
 Saili Rane, badminton player
 Saraswati Rane, singer
 Vishwajit Pratapsingh Rane, politician
 Walter Rane, American illustrator 

Indian surnames